Countess of Jersey is a title given to the wife of the Earl of Jersey. Women who have held the title include:

Barbara Chiffinch, Countess of Jersey (1663-1735), from 1716, widow of Edward Villiers, 1st Earl of Jersey
Anne Russell, Duchess of Bedford, afterwards Countess of Jersey (c.1705 - 1762)
Frances Villiers, Countess of Jersey (1753-1821)
Sarah Villiers, Countess of Jersey (1785-1867)
Margaret Child Villiers, Countess of Jersey (1849-1945)